The 2004 Saint Francis Red Flash football team represented Saint Francis University as a member of the Northeast Conference (NEC) during the 2004 NCAA Division I-AA football season. The Red Flash were led by third-year head coach Dave Opfar and played their home games at the Pine Bowl. They finished the season 3–8 overall and 1–6 in NEC play to place last.

Schedule

References

Saint Francis
Saint Francis Red Flash football seasons
Saint Francis Red Flash football